The Divisiones Regionales de Fútbol in the Region of Murcia are organised by the Football Federation of the Region of Murcia:

Preferente Autonómica de la Región de Murcia (Level 6 of the Spanish football pyramid)
Primera Autonómica de Murcia (Level 7)
Segunda Autonómica de Murcia (Level 8)

League chronology
Timeline

Preferente Autonómica 

 
Preferente Autonómica is the sixth level of competition of the Spanish football league system in that community. The league consists of a group of 18 teams. At the end of the season, the first two teams (places 1 and 2) are automatically promoted to Tercera División RFEF (Group 13). Places 3 to 6 enter a second (knock-out) phase to determine one further promoted team. Last three teams are relegated to the Primera Autonómica.

2022–23 teams

Group 1

Algar
Algezares
Águilas FC B
Bala Azul
Balsicas Atl.
Lumbreras
Luis Guarch
Minerva
Mazarrón
Mar Menor B
Olímpico Totana
Santa Cruz

Group 2
Abarán
Beniel
Churra
Cabezo de Torres
Jumilla Atlético
Plus Ultra
Los Garres
Montecasillas
El Raal
Unión Molinense
Villa de Fortuna
Yeclano Dep. B

Champions

Primera Autonómica
 
Primera Autonómica is the seventh level of competition of the Spanish football league system in that community, founded in 2008. The league consists of a group of 16 teams. At the end of the season the first three teams are promoted and the last three are relegated to Segunda Autonómica.

Segunda Autonómica 

Segunda Autonómica is the eighth and last level of Spanish football league system in Murcia region. This level consists in two groups of 14 teams each one. At the end of the season, the winners of each group are promoted. There are not relegations.

External links
Federación de Fútbol de la Región de Murcia 

Football in the Region of Murcia
Divisiones Regionales de Fútbol